Van der Valk is a Dutch surname literally meaning "from the falcon", often originally referring to a coat of arms. Variations on the name are Van der Valck,  Vandervalk, De Valk en Valk. The name can refer to:

The Dutch Van der Valk hospitality chain
The British Van der Valk television series based on the detective novels of the same name by Nicolas Freeling
A Dutch boatbuilding company, Van der Valk Shipyard, in Waalwijk.

People with the surname
Charlotte Vandervalk (born 1937), American politician
Guido van der Valk (born 1980), Dutch golfer
Kirsten van der Valk (born 1994), Dutch badminton player
Leonardus Cornelius van der Valck (1769–1845), Dutch diplomat and mysterious count in Germany
Pieter de Valk (1584–1625), Dutch Golden Age painter
Simon "Piet" van der Valk, fictional Dutch detective in the Van der Valk novels by Nicolas Freeling
Vasco van der Valk (born 1999), Dutch motorcycle road racer

See also
 van (Dutch)

References

Dutch-language surnames